The Gauchach  is a stream and tributary of the river Wutach in Baden-Württemberg, Germany. It runs through the spectacular Gauchach Gorge.

See also
List of rivers of Baden-Württemberg

References

Rivers of Baden-Württemberg
Rivers of Germany

de:Wutachschlucht#Gauchachschlucht